Fort Littleton is an unincorporated community in Dublin Township in Fulton County, Pennsylvania, United States. Fort Littleton is located at the junction of U.S. Route 522 and Plum Hollow Road, a short distance north of an interchange between US 522 and the Pennsylvania Turnpike (Interstate 76), which is called the Fort Littleton interchange.

References

Unincorporated communities in Fulton County, Pennsylvania
Unincorporated communities in Pennsylvania